Since March 2006, SpaceX has launched 5 Falcon 1 and 204 Falcon 9 rockets. Of these 3 Falcon 1 and 1 Falcon 9 launches were complete failures and one Falcon 9 launch was a partial failure.

Orbital launch attempts

Falcon 1

Falcon 9

Videos

Notes

References 

Lists of rocket launches
SpaceX
Falcon 9
SpaceX related lists